Nari is a monthly women's magazine published nationally in Nepal by Kantipur Publications, a private media company based in Kathmandu.

History and profile
The magazine was started as Sarbottam in 2002. Two years later it was renamed Sarbottam Nari. The magazine is part of Kantipur Publications. It is published in Nepali on a monthly basis. It is also published to the Nepali diaspora in Hong Kong, Malaysia, Japan and Australia.
Upasana Ghimire is the editor of Nari Magazine. This Monthly Women's Magazine has circulation of 86,000 copies.

See also 
 Kantipur 
 Nepali Times 
 Republica

References

External links
 Official website

2002 establishments in Nepal
Magazines established in 2002
Monthly magazines
Magazines published in Nepal
Women's magazines